Thysanota is a genus of air-breathing land snails, terrestrial pulmonate gastropod mollusks in the family Charopidae. These snails are restricted to South India and Sri Lanka.

Eight species are recognized.

Species
 Thysanota conula (Blanford, 1865)
 Thysanota crinigera (Benson, 1850)
 Thysanota eumita (Sykes 1898)
 Thysanota flavida Gude, 1914
 Thysanota grenvillei (Brazier, 1876)
 Thysanota guerini (Pfeiffer, 1842)
 Thysanota hispida (Sykes 1898)
 Thysanota tabida (Pfeiffer, 1855)

References